Ander Zoilo Cerdeira (born 13 July 2001) is a Spanish professional footballer who plays as a left back for CD Calahorra, on loan from Real Sociedad.

Club career
Zoilo was born in Beasain, Gipuzkoa, Basque Country, and joined Real Sociedad's youth setup in 2012 at the age of 12. He made his senior debut with the C-team on 25 August 2019, coming on as a second-half substitute in a 1–1 Tercera División home draw against Club Portugalete.

Zoilo scored his first senior goal on 14 February 2021, netting the C's fifth in a 5–0 home routing of Urgatzi KK, and ended the campaign with 25 appearances as the side achieved promotion to Segunda División RFEF. On 1 July, he renewed his contract until 2023, and spent the entire pre-season with the reserves.

Zoilo made his professional debut with the B-team on 18 September 2021, replacing fellow debutant Jon Magunazelaia in a 1–1 away draw against Real Zaragoza in the Segunda División championship. The following 4 January, he moved on loan to Primera División RFEF side CD Calahorra for the remainder of the season.

References

External links

2000 births
Living people
People from Beasain
Sportspeople from Gipuzkoa
Spanish footballers
Footballers from the Basque Country (autonomous community)
Association football defenders
Segunda División players
Tercera División players
Real Sociedad C footballers
Real Sociedad B footballers
CD Calahorra players
Primera Federación players